Hurdle technology is a method of ensuring that pathogens in food products can be eliminated or controlled. This means the food products will be safe for consumption, and their shelf life will be extended. Hurdle technology usually works by combining more than one approach. These approaches can be thought of as "hurdles" the pathogen has to overcome if it is to remain active in the food. The right combination of hurdles can ensure all pathogens are eliminated or rendered harmless in the final product.

Hurdle technology has been defined by Leistner (2000) as an intelligent combination of hurdles which secures the microbial safety and stability as well as the organoleptic and nutritional quality and the economic viability of food products. The organoleptic quality of the food refers to its sensory properties, that is its look, taste, smell and texture.

Examples of hurdles in a food system are high temperature during processing, low temperature during storage, increasing the acidity, lowering the water activity or redox potential, or the presence of preservatives. According to the type of pathogens and how risky they are, the intensity of the hurdles can be adjusted individually to meet consumer preferences in an economical way, without compromising the safety of the product.

Hurdles
Each hurdle aims to eliminate, inactivate or at least inhibit unwanted microorganisms. Common salt or organic acids can be used as hurdles to control microbials in food. Many natural antimicrobials such as nisin, natamycin and other bacteriocins, and essential oils derived from rosemary or thyme, also work well.

"Traditionally, fermented seafood products common in Japan, provide a typical example of hurdle technology. Fermentation of sushi employs hurdles that favour growth of desirable bacteria but inhibit the growth of pathogens. The important hurdles in the early stages of fermentation are salt and vinegar. Raw fish is cured in salt (20–30%, w/w) for one month before being desalted and pickled in vinegar. The main target of these hurdles is C. botulinum. Growth of lactic acid bacteria during fermentation results in acid production from metabolism of added sugars and rice. The result is a pH hurdle important in controlling growth of C. botulinum."

Synergistic effects
There can be significant synergistic effects between hurdles. For example, Gram-positive bacteria include some of the more important spoilage bacteria, such as Clostridium, Bacillus and Listeria. A synergistic enhancement occurs if nisin is used against these bacteria in combination with antioxidants, organic acids or other antimicrobials. Combining antimicrobial hurdles in an intelligent way means other hurdles can be reduced, yet the resulting food can have superior sensory qualities.

See also
 Biopreservation

References

Food preservation